Hypnotique is the fifth album by Martin Denny. Released on Liberty Records in 1959, it was recorded in 1958 at the Kamehameha Schools auditorium and at the Liberty Studios in Hollywood.

Track listing

Side A
1. "Jungle Madness" (Martin Denny, Hal Johnson) – 3:30 
2. "On a Little Street in Singapore" (Peter DeRose, Billy Hill) – 2:30 
3. "Voodoo Dreams" (Les Baxter) – 2:25 
4. "Chinese Lullaby" (R. H. Bowers) – 2:52 
5. "Hypnotique" (David M.) – 3:10
6. "St. Louis Blues" (W. C. Handy) – 2:39

Side B
1. "We Kiss in a Shadow" (Richard Rodgers, Oscar Hammerstein) – 3:00 
2. "Summertime" (George Gershwin, DuBose Heyward) – 2:52 
3. "Scimitar" (Les Baxter) – 2:30 
4. "American in Bali" (Martin Denny) – 2:24 
5. "Japanese Sandman" (Richard A. Whiting, Raymond B. Egan) – 1:30

Personnel

Musicians and singers
 Martin Denny – piano, celeste, arranger, composer
 Augie Colon – bongos, congas, percussion, bird calls
 Julius Wechter – vibes, marimba, percussion
 Harvey Ragsdale – string bass, marimba
 John Mechigashari – Japanese flute, shakuhachi
 Barbara Smith – koto
 Francis "Bud" Lee – shamisen
 The Jack Halloran Singers – vocals

Other contributors
 Si Waronker – producer
 Garrett-Howard – cover design
 Bob Lang and Ted Keep – engineers
 Sandy Warner – cover model, "the Exotica girl"
 James Michener – liner notes

References

1959 albums
Exotica
Martin Denny albums
Liberty Records albums
Albums produced by Martin Denny
Albums arranged by Martin Denny